David R. Gilmour (born 1958) is an American diplomat who is serving as the United States Ambassador to Equatorial Guinea since 2022.

Early life and education 
Gilmour was raised in Bridgeport, Michigan, where he attended Bridgeport High School. He earned a Bachelor of Arts degree from Saginaw Valley State University and a Master of Arts from the University of Texas at Austin.

Career 
Gilmour is a career member of the Senior Foreign Service, with the rank of Minister-Counselor. He was the Chargé d’Affaires a.i. at the U.S. Embassy in N’Djamena, Chad. He has served in the Bureau of African Affairs at the Department of State as Deputy Assistant Secretary for Central Africa, Director of East African Affairs, and Director of Public Diplomacy for Africa. He was Deputy Chief of Mission at the U.S. embassies in Panama and Malawi, and Counselor for Public Affairs at the U.S. Mission in Geneva. Other overseas assignments have included Australia, Costa Rica, South Africa, and Cameroon.

Ambassador to Togo
Gilmour was the United States ambassador to Togo from November 7, 2015, to March 9, 2019.

Ambassador to Equatorial Guinea
On August 6, 2021, President Joe Biden nominated Gilmour to be the U.S. ambassador to Equatorial Guinea. The Senate Foreign Relations Committee held hearings on his nomination on October 20, 2021. The committee reported the nomination favorably on November 3, 2021. On December 18, 2021, Gilmour was confirmed by the Senate via voice vote. He presented his credentials to President Teodoro Obiang Nguema Mbasogo on May 22, 2022.

Personal life
Gilmour speaks French and Spanish.

References 

1958 births
Living people
21st-century American diplomats
Ambassadors of the United States to Equatorial Guinea
Ambassadors of the United States to Togo
People from Bridgeport, Michigan
Saginaw Valley State University alumni
United States Foreign Service personnel
University of Texas at Austin alumni